Alexander Stepanovich Osipenko (22 July 1991). was a Soviet military aviator and, according to some accounts, the Red Air Force's top ace in the Spanish Civil War.

Early life
Osipenko was born at Tursevo Kula, in what is now Finland prior to the First World War. In 1918 he was living with his family in Smolensk and in 1929 joined the Soviet Air Force, rising to the position of squadron leader in 1937.

Service history
In January 1938 Osipenko went to Spain to service with the Spanish Republican Air Force. He flew with the 1st Escuadrilla de Caza, and was a successful fighter pilot, though his record is contradictory. One source credits him with 17 individual and 34 shared aerial combat victories making him the most successful Soviet pilot of the conflict.
On his return to the Soviet Union Osipenko was made Hero of the Soviet Union.

At the outbreak of the Great Patriotic War in June 1941 Osipenko was a divisional commander on the Southern Front; he rose to Corps commander in September 1943 and also served as deputy commander of the countries fighter air defence.

After the war he served in various posts until his retirement in 1954, after which he held several academic posts connected with aviation.

Alexander Osipenko died on 22 July 1991 in Moscow.

References

Spanish Civil War flying aces
Soviet Air Force officers
Heroes of the Soviet Union
1910 births
1991 deaths
Soviet Air Force generals
Soviet lieutenant generals
Recipients of the Order of Lenin
Recipients of the Order of the Red Banner
Recipients of the Order of Kutuzov, 1st class
Recipients of the Order of Kutuzov, 2nd class
Recipients of the Order of Suvorov, 2nd class
Recipients of the Order of the Cross of Grunwald, 3rd class
Soviet flying aces
Military Academy of the General Staff of the Armed Forces of the Soviet Union alumni